Saeta may refer to:

Culture
 Saeta (brand), a Colombian company that operates its business in the textile sector, in the manufacture, import and export of sportswear and accessories
 Saeta (flamenco), a revered form of Spanish religious song
 Saetia, indie screamo band
 "Saeta", a track on the Miles Davis album Sketches of Spain
 "Saeta", a track on the Nico album Drama of Exile
 Saeta rubia, a 1956 Spanish film directed by Florián Rey
 Saeta TV Channel 10, an Uruguayan television channel
 Saetan Daemon SaDiablo, a fictional character in Anne Bishop's 'The Black Jewels trilogy

Transports
 SAETA (Sociedad Anónima Ecuatoriana de Transportes Aéreos), an Ecuadorian airline
 SAETA Flight 232, a reported missing flight in 1976
 Hispano HA-200 Saeta, a 1950s Spanish jet training aircraft
 Saeta Perú, a Peruvian airline